Petru is a given name, and may refer to:

 Petru I of Moldavia (Petru Mușat, 1375–1391), ruler of Moldavia
 Petru Aron (died 1467), ruler of Moldavia
 Petru Bălan (born 1976), Romanian rugby union footballer
 Petru Cărare (1935–2019), writer from Moldova
 Petru Cercel (died 1590), voivode of Wallachia, polyglot
 Petru Dugulescu (1945–2008), Romanian Baptist pastor, poet, and politician
 Petru Filip (born 1955), current mayor of the municipality of Oradea
 Petru Fudduni ( 1600–1670), poet
 Petru Giovacchini (1910–1955), Corsican hero
 Petru Groza (1884–1958), Romanian politician and Prime Minister
 Petru Lucinschi (born 1940), Moldova's second president
 Petru Luhan (born 1977), Romanian politician
 Petru Maior ( 1756–1821), Romanian writer
 Petru Mocanu (1931–2016), Romanian mathematician
 Petru Pavel Aron (1709–1764), Romanian Greek-Catholic cleric and intellectual
 Petru Poni (1841–1925), Romanian chemist
 Petru Rareș ( 1487–1546), ruler of Moldavia
 Petru Stoianov (born 1931), Romanian composer
 Petru Țurcaș (born 1976), Romanian footballer

 Ryszard Petru (born 1972), Polish politician

See also
 Peter (disambiguation)
 Petr (disambiguation)
 Petra (disambiguation)
 Petre
 Petri
 Petro (disambiguation)

Romanian masculine given names